The following works deal with the cultural, political, economic, military, biographical and geologic history of pre-territorial North Dakota, Dakota Territory and the State of North Dakota.

Surveys of North Dakota history

Historic expeditions

Business, industry and labor

Native American histories

Military histories

Local and regional histories
 
 
 Volume 2

Ghost towns

Natural histories

Biographies

Memoirs, diaries and journals

Political histories

Social history

Geology

Journals
 
 Volume 2, 1908
 Volume 4, 1915
 Volume 6, 1920

Bibliographies

See also
 Bibliography of Montana history
 Bibliography of the Lewis and Clark Expedition

Notes

History of North Dakota
Bibliographies of the United States and territories
Bibliographies of history